Nema, a.k.a. Gusan, is one of the Finisterre languages of Papua New Guinea. Speakers use the name "Nema"; "Gusan" is found in the literature. A language survey team visited the area and reported that the name "Nema" is locally known, though "Gusan" had been used to refer to the language by some linguistic publications in the past.

References

Finisterre languages
Languages of Morobe Province